The red-nosed mouse (Wiedomys pyrrhorhinos) is an arboreal rodent species endemic to Brazil. It is found in caatinga and cerrado habitat in southeast Brazil.

References

Wiedomys
Mammals of Brazil
Endemic fauna of Brazil
Taxa named by Prince Maximilian of Wied-Neuwied
Mammals described in 1821